Fahlian-e Sofla (also Romanized as Fahlīān-e Soflá; also known as Fahlīān-e Pā’īn and Shūlestān Qal‘eh Mīrzā Mollā) is a village in Fahlian Rural District, in the Central District of Mamasani County, Fars Province, Iran. At the 2006 census, its population was 1,120, in 253 families.

References 

Populated places in Mamasani County